Posthumous Diary (Diario postumo) is a series of poems attributed to the Italian poet Eugenio Montale which first appeared in full in 1996 (see 1996 in poetry). It was purported to be conceived as a literary time-bomb carried out with the help of a young fan, Annalisa Cima.

In 1969 Montale began to give a poem to Cima at each meeting. In 1979 he   divided the poems into eleven envelopes. Ten (numbered I to X) contained six poems each, while the eleventh contained another packet of six poems (numbered XI) as well as eighteen additional poems for three further envelopes. Montale entrusted the collection to Cima under the condition that they would not appear until after his death.

In 1986 the Schlesinger Foundation began issuing a limited edition series of booklets, numbered I to XI, for each group of six poems. A twelfth volume appeared in 1996 with the remaining eighteen poems, and in the same year followed a collection of the entire series published by Mondadori.

The work immediately caused a scandal in Italian literary circles. Some critics believed that the poems were composed by Cima out of conversations with Montale, while others believed Cima had forged them outright. Maria Corti, a professor of philology at the University of Pavia to whose library Montale had donated most of his papers, publicly stated that Montale had told her about the poems, which he intended as a practical joke on his critics (http://ricerca.repubblica.it/repubblica/archivio/repubblica/1997/09/04/montale-dopo-il-parapiglia.html?refresh_ce). The critic Dante Isella thinks that this work is not authentic. 
More recently, many doubts (based on stylometric, graphologic and archival considerations) concerning authenticity have been expressed during a congress held in Bologna (http://corrieredibologna.corriere.it/bologna/notizie/cultura/2014/7-novembre-2014/diario-postumo-montale-falso-filologo-condello-abbiamo-prove-230495319702.shtml). But the matter remains controversial.

Posthumous Diary was translated into English by Jonathan Galassi and published in 2001.

References

2001 books
2001 poems
Italian poetry collections
Arnoldo Mondadori Editore books